The Windjammer is a 1926 American silent action film directed by Harry Joe Brown and starring Billy Sullivan, Thelma Hill and Billy Franey. It was distributed by the independent Rayart Pictures, the forerunner of Monogram Pictures.

Synopsis
After graduating from college, Billy Tanner	enters his family's old circus business. He becomes engaged in a running battle with a champion boxer who he is forced to fight.

Cast
 Billy Sullivan as Billy Tanner	
 Thelma Hill 	
 Billy Franey 
 J.P. Lockney 
 Robert Walker
 Fred Burns
 George Magrill
 Henry Roquemore
 Gypsy Clark

References

Bibliography
 Munden, Kenneth White. The American Film Institute Catalog of Motion Pictures Produced in the United States, Part 1. University of California Press, 1997.

External links
 

1920s American films
1926 films
1920s action films
1920s English-language films
American silent feature films
American action films
American black-and-white films
Films directed by Harry Joe Brown
Rayart Pictures films